George Hunter Enis (born December 10, 1936, in Fort Worth, Texas) is a former American collegiate and Professional Football quarterback who played for three seasons in the American Football League. He played for the Dallas Texans in 1960, the San Diego Chargers in 1961, and the Oakland Raiders and the Denver Broncos in 1962. He played college football at Texas Christian University, and currently serves on their board of trustees.

See also
Other American Football League players

References

External links
 Pro Football Reference

1936 births
Living people
American football quarterbacks
TCU Horned Frogs football players
Dallas Texans (AFL) players
San Diego Chargers players
Sportspeople from Fort Worth, Texas
Oakland Raiders players
Denver Broncos (AFL) players
Denver Broncos coaches
American Football League players